Directive 75/319/EEC of 20 May 1975 on the approximation of the laws of Member States relating to analytical, pharmaco-toxicological and clinical standards and protocols in respect of the testing of proprietary medicinal products. This directive of the European Union sought to bring the benefits of innovative pharmaceuticals to patients across Europe by introducing the mutual recognition, by Member States, of their respective national marketing authorisations.

The Directive says that Member States shall take all appropriate measures to ensure that the documents and particulars for marketing authorization requests are drawn up by experts with the necessary technical or professional qualifications before they are submitted to the competent authorities.

See also
 EudraLex
 Directive 75/318/EEC
 Directive 65/65/EEC1
 Directive 93/41/EEC
 Directive 2001/83/EC
 Regulation of therapeutic goods
 European Medicines Agency

References 
 Second Council Directive 75/319/EEC of 20 May 1975

Pharmaceuticals policy
75 319
1975 in law
1975 in the European Economic Community